Epicyrtica is a genus of moths of the family Noctuidae.

Species
 Epicyrtica bryistis Turner, 1902
 Epicyrtica docima Turner, 1920
 Epicyrtica hippolopha Turner, 1936
 Epicyrtica lathridia Turner, 1908
 Epicyrtica leucostigma Turner, 1902
 Epicyrtica lichenophora Lower, 1902
 Epicyrtica melanops Lower, 1902
 Epicyrtica metallica Lucas, 1898
 Epicyrtica oostigma Turner, 1929
 Epicyrtica pamprepta Turner, 1922

References
 Epicyrtica at Markku Savela's Lepidoptera and Some Other Life Forms
 

Calpinae
Moth genera